Ramshir (also Romanized as Rāmshīr; formerly known as Ram Shihr, Khalaf Abad, and Khalafābād) is the capital city of Ramshir County in Khuzestan Province, Iran.  At the 2006 census, its population was 24,782, in 4,604 families.

See also 
 Ebrahim Matinian, representative of Ramhormoz and Ramshir in the Islamic Consultative Assembly

References

Populated places in Ramshir County

Cities in Khuzestan Province